Lamuria is a settlement in Kenya's Rift Valley Province.Laikipia county

References 

Populated places in Rift Valley Province